Ontario Public Interest Research Group is a decentralized network of local Public Interest Research Groups located in the province of Ontario, Canada.   

OPIRG was founded in 1972 after a speech by Ralph Nader at the University of Waterloo.

Unlike the U.S. PIRG, each OPIRG operates independently on the local level, with members deciding which action projects to pursue. OPIRG has no affiliations with the U.S. Public Interest Research Group. 

Multiple OPIRG groups have been targets of defunding campaigns by conservative groups.

References

External links
OPIRG Network
Laurier Students’ Public Interest Research Group
Mohawk PIRG
OPIRG Brock
OPIRG Carleton
OPIRG Guelph
OPIRG Kingston
OPIRG McMaster
OPIRG Peterborough
OPIRG Toronto
OPIRG Windsor
OPIRG York
OPIRG-GRIPO Ottawa
WPIRG

Public Interest Research Groups
Organizations based in Ontario